Forbidden Memory is a Filipino documentary that studies a people's collective memory and the policy of genocide around the events that led to the Malisbong Massacre of 1974. The film is directed by Gutierrez "Teng" Mangansakan III. It was shown during the 12th Cinema One Originals festival in November 2016.

Background and synopsis
The documentary revolves around a group of people's collective memory of the September 1974 Malisbong Massacre that was part of the overall counter-insurgency effort of Ferdinand Marcos during the Marcos martial law era. Not known to the majority of the Filipinos, at least 1,500 Moro residents of the coastal barangay of Malisbong in Palimbang, Sultan Kudarat were killed in the massacre. The film “summons remembrances and memories of the fateful days in September 1974 when about 1,000 men from Malisbong and neighboring villages in Palimbang, Sultan Kudarat province, were killed while 3,000 women and children were forcibly taken to naval boats stationed nearby where they encountered unspeakable horror. The genocide and atrocities were perpetrated under the dark years of the Martial Law regime of Ferdinand Marcos.”

Release
The movie had its premiere in the Cinema One Originals festival that ran from November 14–22, 2016. It was marketed in film posters with the slogan "The Greatest Marcos Horror Story Never Told".

Awards
The film won the "Best Documentary" award in the 12th edition of Cinema One Originals, the annual film festival sponsored by Cinema One.

References